East Tulare Villa is a census-designated place (CDP) in Tulare County, California. The 2010 United States census reported East Tulare Villa's population was 778.

Geography
According to the United States Census Bureau, the CDP covers an area of 0.5 square miles (1.2 km), all of it land.

Demographics

At the 2010 census East Tulare Villa had a population of 778. The racial makeup of East Tulare Villa was 491 (63.1%) White, 9 (1.2%) African American, 6 (0.8%) Native American, 10 (1.3%) Asian, 0 (0.0%) Pacific Islander, 226 (29.0%) from other races, and 36 (4.6%) from two or more races. Hispanic or Latino of any race were 428 people (55.0%).

The whole population lived in households, no one lived in non-institutionalized group quarters and no one was institutionalized.

There were 208 households, 110 (52.9%) had children under the age of 18 living in them, 133 (63.9%) were opposite-sex married couples living together, 29 (13.9%) had a female householder with no husband present, 17 (8.2%) had a male householder with no wife present.  There were 8 (3.8%) unmarried opposite-sex partnerships, and 1 (0.5%) same-sex married couples or partnerships. 19 households (9.1%) were one person and 6 (2.9%) had someone living alone who was 65 or older. The average household size was 3.74.  There were 179 families (86.1% of households); the average family size was 3.98.

The age distribution was 258 people (33.2%) under the age of 18, 77 people (9.9%) aged 18 to 24, 183 people (23.5%) aged 25 to 44, 202 people (26.0%) aged 45 to 64, and 58 people (7.5%) who were 65 or older.  The median age was 32.1 years. For every 100 females, there were 102.1 males.  For every 100 females age 18 and over, there were 102.3 males.

There were 218 housing units at an average density of 452.3 per square mile, of the occupied units 125 (60.1%) were owner-occupied and 83 (39.9%) were rented. The homeowner vacancy rate was 0.8%; the rental vacancy rate was 2.3%.  433 people (55.7% of the population) lived in owner-occupied housing units and 345 people (44.3%) lived in rental housing units.

References

Census-designated places in Tulare County, California
Census-designated places in California